Tuomi is a Finnish surname.

Geographical distribution
As of 2014, 74.5% of all known bearers of the surname Tuomi were residents of Finland (frequency 1:1,686), 12.3% of the United States (1:668,984), 4.3% of Canada (1:196,781), 3.8% of Sweden (1:58,963), 1.5% of Russia (1:2,219,864) and 1.5% of Australia (1:371,467).

In Finland, the frequency of the surname was higher than national average (1:1,686) in the following regions:
 1.Southwest Finland (1:720)
 2.Päijänne Tavastia (1:826)
 3.Satakunta (1:886)
 4.Tavastia Proper (1:1,177)
 5.Pirkanmaa (1:1,405)
 6. Uusimaa (1:1,514)

People
Ilkka Tuomi (born 1958), Finnish computer scientist
Juha Tuomi (born 1989), Finnish footballer
Lempi Tuomi (1882–1958), Finnish politician
Liisa Tuomi (1924–1989), Finnish actress
Steven Tuomi (1962-1987), American murder victim of Jeffrey Dahmer
Matias Tuomi (born 1985), Finnish squash player
Mikko Tuomi, Finnish astronomer
Olavi Tuomi (1932–2006), Finnish cinematographer
Rauli Tuomi (1919–1949), Finnish actor
Tanja Tuomi (born 1996), Finnish tennis player

See also
Petri Tuomi-Nikula (born 1951), Finnish diplomat

References

Finnish-language surnames
Surnames of Finnish origin